AWS Elastic Beanstalk is an orchestration service offered by Amazon Web Services for deploying applications which orchestrates various AWS services, including EC2, S3, Simple Notification Service (SNS), CloudWatch, autoscaling, and Elastic Load Balancers. Elastic Beanstalk provides an additional layer of abstraction over the bare server and OS; users instead see a pre-built combination of OS and platform, such as "64bit Amazon Linux 2014.03 v1.1.0 running Ruby 2.0 (Puma)" or "64bit Debian jessie v2.0.7 running Python 3.4 (Preconfigured - Docker)". Deployment requires a number of components to be defined: an  'application'  as a logical container for the project, a  'version'  which is a deployable build of the application executable, a  'configuration template'  that contains configuration information for both the Beanstalk environment and for the product. Finally an  'environment'  combines a  'version'  with a  'configuration'  and deploys them. Executables themselves are uploaded as archive files to S3 beforehand and the  'version'  is just a pointer to this.

Name
The name "Elastic beanstalk" is a reference to the beanstalk that grew all the way up to the clouds in the fairy tale Jack and the Beanstalk.

Applications and software stacks
Supported applications and software stacks include:
 Apache Tomcat for Java applications
 Apache HTTP Server for PHP applications
 Apache HTTP Server for Python applications
 Nginx or Apache HTTP Server for Node.js applications
 Passenger or Puma for Ruby applications
 Microsoft IIS 7.5, 8.0, and 8.5 for .NET applications
 Java SE
 Docker
 Go

Alternative AWS technologies
 AWS CloudFormation provides a declarative template-based Infrastructure as Code model for configuring AWS.
 AWS OpsWorks provides configuration of EC2 services using Chef.

References

External links
 

Elastic Beanstalk
Cloud platforms
Web services
Computer-related introductions in 2011